The Apuseni Natural Park is a protected area (natural park category V IUCN) situated in Romania, in the administrative territory of counties Alba, Bihor and Cluj.

Location 
The Natural Park is located in western Romania in the central-northern side of the Apuseni Mountains, comprising a part of the Bihor Mountains at south and Vlădeasa Mountains at north.

Description 
The Apuseni Natural Park with an area of  ha was declared natural protected area by the Law Number 5 of March 6, 2000 (published in the Monitorul Oficial of Romania, Number 152 of April 12, 2000) and represents a mountainous area (mountain peaks, cirques, caves, valleys, karst areas, forests and pastures), with flora and fauna specific Western Carpathians.

Natural reserves included in the park: Izbucul de la Cotețul Dobreștilor (0.20 ha), Izbucul Mătișești (2 ha), Izbucul Tăuzului (1 ha), Coiba Mare Cave (0.50 ha), Avenul din Hoanca Urzicarului (1 ha), Scărișoara Cave (1 ha) and Ghețarul de la Vârtop (1 ha) in Alba county; Pietrele Galbenei(6.30 ha), Cetatea Rădesei Cave (20 ha), Poiana Florilor (1 ha), Platoul Carstic Padiș (39 ha), Valea Galbenei (70.50 ha), Valea Sighiștelului (412.60 ha), Vârful Biserica Moțului (3 ha), Platoul carstic Lumea Pierdută (39 ha), Cetățile Ponorului (14.90 ha), Ghețarul Focul Viu Cave (0.10 ha), Ciur Izbuc Cave (0.10 ha), Micula’s Cave (0.10 ha), Urşilor Cave (1 ha), Smeii de la Onceasa Cave (0.50 ha) and Cerbului Cave-Avenul cu Vacă (45 ha) in Bihor County; Molhașul Mare de la Izbuc (8 ha) in Cluj county.

References 

Protected areas of Romania
Geography of Alba County
Geography of Bihor County
Geography of Cluj County
Tourist attractions in Alba County
Tourist attractions in Bihor County
Tourist attractions in Cluj County
Protected areas established in 2000